Jiřího z Poděbrad Square (George of Poděbrady Square, officially: náměstí Jiřího z Poděbrad) is located in Vinohrady district in Prague, the capital of the Czech Republic. It is dominated by Art Nouveau Church of the Most Sacred Heart of Our Lord from 1932, which stands in the middle of it. The majority of the square is actually an urban park, there is also a stone fountain included. Metro and tram stops of the same are located on the square.{
  "type": "FeatureCollection",
  "features": [
    {
      "type": "Feature",
      "properties": {},
      "geometry": {
        "type": "Point",
        "coordinates": [
          14.450154304504396,
          50.07792274916937
        ]
      }
    }
  ]
}

History 
Jiřího z Poděbrad Square was established in 1896 and was previously called King George Square (Náměstí krále Jiřího), by name of George of Poděbrady, who was a king of Bohemia from 1458 to 1471. The name of the square was changed to the current one in 1948.

References

See also 

 Jiřího z Poděbrad (Prague Metro)
 Church of the Most Sacred Heart of Our Lord

Squares in Prague
George of Poděbrady
Prague 3